Leverndale Hospital is a mental health facility at Crookston, Glasgow, Scotland. It is managed by NHS Greater Glasgow and Clyde. The , which has been taken out of use, is Category A listed.

History
The hospital, which was designed by Malcolm Stark in the Renaissance Revival style, opened as the Govan District Asylum in September 1895. Two single‑storey pavilions were added in 1908. In 1914, the nearby 17th century Hawkhead House mansion was annexed to become part of the hospital facility, which became known as Hawkhead Asylum (not to be confused with Hawkhead Hospital for infectious diseases a short distance to the west within the boundaries of Paisley, which was constructed in the 1930s).

It joined the National Health Service in 1948 as Hawkhead Mental Hospital; Hawkhead House was demolished in the 1950s. The facility's name was changed to Leverndale Hospital in 1964, and new units for psycho‑geriatric patients were added in the mid-1970s.

Modern medical facilities built on the site to replace the older buildings include a new acute admissions unit completed in summer 2013.

References

External links

Hospitals in Glasgow
NHS Scotland hospitals
Hospital buildings completed in 1895
Hospitals established in 1895
1895 establishments in Scotland
Psychiatric hospitals in Scotland
Renaissance Revival architecture in the United Kingdom
Category A listed buildings in Glasgow